Estádio Giulite Coutinho, also known as Estádio Édson Passos, is a multi-use stadium located in the city of Mesquita, Rio de Janeiro State, Brazil. It is used mostly for football matches and hosts the home matches of Fluminense, America Football Club and Nova Iguaçu. The stadium has a maximum capacity of 13,544 spectators and was built in 2000.

History
The stadium was inaugurated on January 23, 2000, when America beat a Rio de Janeiro State Combined Team by 3–1. The first goal of the stadium was scored by Rio de Janeiro State Combined Team's Sorato.

Estádio Giulite Coutinho's attendance record currently stands at 9,009, set on March 5, 2006 when America and Flamengo drew 2–2.

Currently, Fluminense has plans of renovating the stadium and increasing its capacity to 15,000, so that it can host their home matches for the 2016 Série A.

References

External links
 America's official website
 Templos do Futebol

Giulite Coutinho
Football venues in Rio de Janeiro (state)
America Football Club (RJ)